Bbánlám Uē Pìngyīm Hōng'àn, Bbánlám pìngyīm, Minnan pinyin or simply pingyim, is a romanization system for Hokkien Southern Min, in particular the Amoy (Xiamen) version of this language. This alphabet was developed by Xiamen University.

Names
Various names are used such as Bbínpīn Hōngàn, BbínPīn or BP. It is commonly known as Pumindian in Taiwan, named after the Mandarin-Southern Min Dictionary where the system is used, but the formal Chinese name is Southern Min Language Spelling System.

Alphabet
The BP alphabet adopts the Latin alphabet of 20 letters, 5 digraphs and 5 diacritics to express the basic sounds of the Min Nan language:

Notes

External links
Southern Min Dialect Spelling System 

Romanization of Hokkien
Southern Min
Writing systems introduced in the 20th century